The Prado Museum, officially known as Museo Nacional del Prado, is the main Spanish national art museum, located in central Madrid. It is widely considered to house one of the world's finest collections of European art, dating from the 12th century to the early 20th century, based on the former Spanish royal collection, and the single best collection of Spanish art. Founded as a museum of paintings and sculpture in 1819, it also contains important collections of other types of works. The Prado Museum is one of the most visited sites in the world and is considered one of the greatest art museums in the world. The numerous works by Francisco Goya, the single most extensively represented artist, as well as by Hieronymus Bosch, El Greco, Peter Paul Rubens, Titian, and Diego Velázquez, are some of the highlights of the collection. Velázquez and his keen eye and sensibility were also responsible for bringing much of the museum's fine collection of Italian masters to Spain, now one of the largest outside Italy.

The collection currently comprises around 8,200 drawings, 7,600 paintings, 4,800 prints, and 1,000 sculptures, in addition to many other works of art and historic documents. As of 2012, the museum displayed about 1,300 works in the main buildings, while around 3,100 works were on temporary loan to various museums and official institutions. The remainder were in storage. 

Due to the COVID-19 pandemic, in 2020 attendance plunged by 76 percent to 852,161. Nonetheless, the Prado was ranked as the 16th most-visited museum in the list of most-visited art museums in the world in 2020. It is one of the largest museums in Spain.

The Prado, with the nearby Thyssen-Bornemisza Museum and the Museo Reina Sofía, forms Madrid's Golden Triangle of Art, which was included in the UNESCO World Heritage list in 2021.

History
The building that is now the home of the Museo Nacional del Prado was designed in 1785 by architect of the Enlightenment in Spain Juan de Villanueva on the orders of Charles III to house the Natural History Cabinet. Nonetheless, the building's final function was not decided until the monarch's grandson, Ferdinand VII, encouraged by his wife, Queen María Isabel de Braganza, decided to use it as a new Royal Museum of Paintings and Sculptures. The royal museum, which would soon become known as the National Museum of Painting and Sculpture, and subsequently the Museo Nacional del Prado, opened to the public for the first time in November 1819. It was created with the double aim of showing the works of art belonging to the Spanish Crown and to demonstrate to the rest of Europe that Spanish art was of equal merit to any other national school. Also, this museum needed several renovations during the 19th and 20th centuries, because of the increase of the collection as well as the increase of the public who wants to see all the collection that the museum hosted.

The first catalogue of the museum, published in 1819 and solely devoted to Spanish painting, included 311 paintings, although at that time the museum housed 1,510 from the various royal residences, the Reales Sitios, including works from other schools. The exceptionally important royal collection, which forms the nucleus of the present-day Museo del Prado, started to increase significantly in the 16th century during the time of Charles V and continued under the succeeding Habsburg and Bourbon monarchs. Their efforts and determination led to the royal collection being enriched by some of the masterpieces now to be seen in the Prado. These include The Descent from the Cross (van der Weyden) by Rogier van der Weyden, The Garden of Earthly Delights by Hieronymous Bosch, The Nobleman with his Hand on his Chest by El Greco, Death of the Virgin (Mantegna) by Mantegna, The Holy Family, known as "La Perla (painting)", by Raphael, Equestrian Portrait of Charles V by Titian, Christ Washing the Disciples’ Feet by Tintoretto, Dürer's Self-portrait at 26, Las Meninas by Velázquez, The Three Graces by Rubens, and The Family of Charles IV by Goya.

In addition to works from the Spanish royal collection, the other holdings increased and enriched the museum with further masterpieces, such as the two Majas by Goya. Among the now closed museums whose collections have been added to that of the Prado were the Museo de la Trinidad in 1872, and the Museo de Arte Moderno in 1971. In addition, numerous legacies, donations and purchases have been of crucial importance for the growth of the collection. Various works entered the Prado from the Museo de la Trinidad, including The Fountain of Grace by the School of Van Eyck, the Santo Domingo and San Pedro Martír altarpieces painted for the monastery of Santo Tomás in Ávila by Pedro Berruguete, and the five canvases by El Greco executed for the Colegio de doña María de Aragón. Most of the Museum's 19th-century paintings come from the former Museo de Arte Moderno, including works by the Madrazos, José de Madrazo y Agudo and Federico de Madrazo, Vicente López, Carlos de Haes, Eduardo Rosales and Sorolla.

Upon the deposition of Isabella II in 1868, the museum was nationalized and acquired the new name of "Museo del Prado". The building housed the royal collection of arts, and it rapidly proved too small. The first enlargement to the museum took place in 1918. Since the creation of the Museo del Prado more than 2,300 paintings have been incorporated into its collection, as well as numerous sculptures, prints, drawings and works of art through bequests, donations and purchases, which account for most of the New Acquisitions. Numerous bequests have enriched the museum's holdings, such as the outstanding collection of medals left to the museum by Pablo Bosch; the drawings and items of decorative art left by Pedro Fernández Durán as well as Van der Weyden's masterpiece, Duran Madonna; and the Ramón de Errazu bequest of 19th-century paintings. Particularly important donations include Barón Emile d'Erlanger's gift of Goya's Black Paintings in 1881. Among the numerous works that have entered the collection through purchase are some outstanding ones acquired in recent years including two works by El Greco, The Fable and The Flight into Egypt acquired in 1993 and 2001, Goya's The Countess of Chinchon bought in 2000, Velázquez's Portrait of Ferdinando Brandani, acquired in 2003, Bruegel's The Wine of Saint Martin's Day bought in 2010 and Fra Angelico's Madonna of the Pomegranate purchased in 2016.

Between 1873 and 1900, the Prado helped decorate city halls, new universities, and churches. During the Second Spanish Republic from 1931 to 1936, the focus was on developing provincial museums. During the Spanish Civil War, upon the recommendation of the League of Nations, the museum staff removed 353 paintings, 168 drawings and the Dauphin's Treasure and sent the art to Valencia, then later to Girona, and finally to Geneva. The art had to be returned across French territory in night trains to the museum upon the commencement of World War II. During the early years of the dictatorship of Francisco Franco, many paintings were sent to embassies.

The main building was enlarged with short pavilions in the rear between 1900 and 1960. The next enlargement was the incorporation of two buildings (nearby but not adjacent) into the institutional structure of the museum: the Casón del Buen Retiro, which is equipped to display up to 400 paintings and which housed the bulk of the 20th-century art from 1971 to 1997, and the Salón de Reinos (Throne building), formerly the Army Museum.

In 1993, an extension proposed by the Prado's director at the time, Felipe Garin, was quickly abandoned after a wave of criticism. In the late 1990s, a $14 million roof work forced the Velázquez masterpiece Las Meninas to change galleries twice. In 1998, the Prado annex in the nearby Casón del Buen Retiro closed for a $10 million two-year overhaul that included three new underground levels. In 2007, the museum finally executed Rafael Moneo's project to expand its exposition room to 16,000 square meters, hoping to increase the yearly number of visitors from 1.8 million to 2.5 million. 

A glass-roofed and wedge-shaped foyer now contains the museum's shops and cafeteria, removing them from the main building to make more room for galleries. The 16th-century Cloister of Jerónimo has been removed stone by stone to make foundations for increased stability of surrounding buildings and will be re-assembled in the new museum's extension. Hydraulic jacks had to be used to prevent the basement walls from falling during construction.
 The enlargement is an underground building which connects the main building to another one entirely reconstructed.

In November 2016, it was announced that British architect Norman Foster, in a joint project with Carlos Rubio Carvajal, is to renovate the Hall of Realms, which once formed part of the Buen Retiro palace and transform it into a $32 million extension of the Prado. The museum announced the selection of Foster and Rubio after a jury reviewed the proposals of the eight competition finalists – including David Chipperfield, Rem Koolhaas and Eduardo Souto de Moura –, who had already been shortlisted from an initial list of 47 international teams of architects. The building was acquired by the Prado in 2015, after having served as an army museum until 2005. The project is designed to give the Prado about 61,500 square feet of additional available space, of which about 27,000 square feet will be used to exhibit works. Only in 2021, the Spanish government approved the plans and awarded the project 36 million euros.

Historic structure

The Prado Museum building is one of the buildings constructed during the reign of Charles III (Carlos III) as part of a grandiose building scheme designed to bestow upon Madrid a monumental urban space. The building was initially conceived by José Moñino y Redondo, count of Floridablanca, and was commissioned in 1785 by Charles III for the reurbanización of the Paseo del Prado. To this end, Charles III called on one of his favorite architects, Juan de Villanueva, author also of the nearby Botanical Garden and the City Hall of Madrid.

The prado ("meadow") that was where the museum now stands gave its name to the area, the Salón del Prado (later Paseo del Prado), and to the museum itself upon nationalisation. Work on the building stopped at the conclusion of Charles III's reign and throughout the Peninsular War and was only initiated again during the reign of Charles III's grandson, Ferdinand VII. The premises had been used as headquarters for the cavalry and a gunpowder-store for the Napoleonic troops based in Madrid during the war.

The next renovations that this museum will undergo will be conducted by British architect Norman Foster. This renovation was approved in June 2020 and is expected to take a minimum of four years.

Collection highlights

Selected works

Management

Funding
Until the early 2000s, the Prado's annual income was approximately $18 million, $15 million of which came from the government and the remainder from private contributions, publications, and admissions. In 2001, the conservative government of José María Aznar decided to change the museum's financing platform, ushering in a public-private partnership. Under its new bylaws, which the Cortes Generales approved in 2003, the Prado must gradually reduce its level of state support to 50 percent from 80 percent. In exchange, the museum gained control of the budget — now roughly €35 million — and the power to raise money from corporate donations and merchandising. However, its recent €150 million expansion was paid for by the Spanish state.

In 1991, Manuel Villaescusa bequeathed his fortune of nearly $40 million in Madrid real estate to the Prado, to be used solely for the acquisition of paintings. The museum subsequently sold Villaescusa's buildings to realize income from them. The bequest suddenly made the Prado one of the most formidable bidders for paintings in the world.

Directors
The first four directors were drawn from nobility. From 1838 to 1960, the directors were mostly artists. Since then, most of them have been art historians.

The Marquess of Santa Cruz, 1817–1820
The Prince of Anglona, 1820–1823
, 1823–1826
The Duke of Híjar, 1826–1838
José de Madrazo, 1838–1857
Juan Antonio de Ribera, 1857–1860
Federico de Madrazo, 1860–1868
Antonio Gisbert, 1868–1873
Francisco Sans Cabot, 1873–1881
Federico de Madrazo, 1881–1894
Vicente Palmaroli, 1894–1896
Francisco Pradilla, 1896–1898
Luis Álvarez Catalá, 1898–1901
José Villegas Cordero, 1901–1918
Aureliano de Beruete y Moret, 1918–1922
Fernando Álvarez de Sotomayor, 1922–1931
Ramón Pérez de Ayala, 1931–1936 
Pablo Ruiz Picasso, 1936–1939
Fernando Álvarez de Sotomayor, 1939–1960
Francisco Javier Sánchez Cantón, 1960–1968
Diego Angulo Íñiguez, 1968–1971
, 1971–1978
, 1978–1981
, 1981–1983 
, 1983–1991
, 1991–1993
Francisco Calvo Serraller, 1993–1994
, 1994–1996
, 1996–2002
, 2002–2017
, 2017 – present

In Google Earth
In 2009, the Prado Museum selected 14 of its most important paintings to be displayed in Google Earth and Google Maps at extremely high resolution, with the largest displayed at 14,000 megapixels. The images' zoom capability allows for close-up views of paint texture and fine detail.

Nearby museums
A few meters away there are two museums of international significance, the Thyssen-Bornemisza Museum and the Museo Reina Sofía.

Nearby is the Real Academia de Bellas Artes de San Fernando. The Museo Arqueológico houses the archaeological collections formerly in the collection of the Prado, with works from Spain, Ancient Egypt, Mesopotamia, Greece, and Rome.

The Naval museum, managed by the Ministry of Defence, is also nearby.

Special exhibitions
Between 8 November 2011 and 25 March 2012, a group of 179 works of art were brought to the Museo del Prado from the Hermitage Museum in St. Petersburg. Notable works included:
 A Scholar (1631), by Rembrandt
 The Lute Player (c. 1596), by Caravaggio
 Ecstasy of Saint Teresa (1647), by Bernini
 Game of Bowls (1908), by Henri Matisse
 Bouquet of Cornflowers with Stems of Oats in a Vase (c. 1900), by House of Fabergé
 Pond at Montgeron (1876), by Claude Monet
 Belt buckle with a monster attacking a horse, (4th–3rd century BC), (gold ornament from Peter I's Siberian Collection)
 Moonrise, Two Men on the Shore (c. 1900), by Caspar David Friedrich
 Composition VI (1913), by Wassily Kandinsky
 Metaphysical Still life (1918), by Giorgio Morandi

Conversely, for the first time in its 200-year history, the Museo del Prado has toured an exhibition of its renowned collection of Italian masterpieces at the National Gallery of Victoria in Melbourne, Australia, from 16 May 2014 until 31 August 2014. Many of the works have never before left Spain.

References

Further reading
Alcolea Blanch, Santiago. The Prado, translated by Richard-Lewis Rees and Angela Patricia Hall. Madrid: Ediciones Polígrafa 1991.
Araujo Sánchez, Ceferino. Los museos de España. Madrid 1875.
Blanco, Antonio. Museo del Prado. Catálago de la Escultura. I Esculturas clásicas. II. Escultura, copia e imitaciones de las antiguas) (siglos XVI–XVIII). Madrid 1957.
Luca de Tena, Consuelo and Mena, Manuela. Guía actualizada del Prado. Madrid: Alfiz 1985.
Rumeu de Armas, Antonio. Origen y fundación del Museo del Prado. Madrid: Instituto de España 1980.

External links

Masterworks in the collection
Prado in Google Earth, extra high resolution

 
Prado
Prado
Paseo del Prado
Bien de Interés Cultural landmarks in Madrid
Tourism in Madrid
Art museums established in 1819
1819 establishments in Spain
Juan de Villanueva buildings
Neoclassical architecture in Madrid
Cultural tourism in Spain
Buildings and structures in Jerónimos neighborhood, Madrid